Haacke's legless skink (Typhlosaurus braini), also known commonly as Brain's legless skink and Brain's blind legless skink, is a species of lizard in the family Scincidae. The species is endemic to Namibia.

Etymology
The specific name, braini, is in honor of paleontologist Charles Kimberlin Brain.

Habitat

Description
T. braini is limbless, slender, and uniformly light pink.

Behavior
Having no limbs, T. braini "swims" in sand dunes, both under the surface and at the surface.

Diet
The diet of T. braini consists of termites and insect larvae.

Reproduction
T. braini is viviparous.

Predators
T. braini is preyed upon by the Namib golden mole (Eremitalpa granti namibensis).

References

Further reading
Haacke WD (1964). "Description of two new species of lizards and notes on Fitzsimonsia brevipes (FitzSimons) from the central Namib desert". Scientific Papers of the Namib Desert Research Station 25: 1–15. (Typhlosaurus braini, new species, p. 5).
Haacke WD (1975). "Herpetological investigations in the sand sea of the southern Namib". Transvaal Museum Bulletin (15): 8–10.
Lamb T, Biswas S, Bauer AM (2010). "A phylogenetic reassessment of African fossorial skinks in the subfamily Acontinae (Squamata: Scincidae): evidence for parallelism and polyphyly". Zootaxa 2657: 33–46.

Typhlosaurus
Skinks of Africa
Reptiles of Namibia
Endemic fauna of Namibia
Reptiles described in 1964